Koonendah Railway Station was a railway station on the Mortlake railway line. It was opened on February 4, 1890, as Keilambete Railway Station. It was closed in 1890 then reopened in 1891 and closed again in 1900. Only a total of 184 passengers used the station during its lifetime.

References 

Disused railway stations in Victoria (Australia)
Railway stations opened in 1890
Railway stations closed in 1900